Fleringe is a populated area, a socken (not to be confused with parish), on the Swedish island of Gotland. It comprises the same area as the administrative Fleringe District, established on 1January 2016.

Community 
The name is known since 1304 as Fledynge, the first part flaidh meaning "tear or wound" is figuratively used for "hills" or "wound in the landscape", such "wounds" can be found north and northwest of the church, and the last part inge meaning "inhabitants". Fleringe is situated on the north coast of the main island, Gotland, west of Fårösund and right by Lake Bästeträsk. Fleringe is mostly forested land.

A number of grave mounds and stone circles from the bronze age can be found at Fleringe. The medieval Fleringe Church is located in Fleringe. , Fleringe Church belongs to Bunge-Rute-Fleringe parish in Norra Gotlands pastorat, along with the churches in Bunge and Rute .

One of the asteroids in the Asteroid belt, 9359 Fleringe, is named after this place.

Limestone industry 
From 1650, and peaking during the 1920s, the area around Fleringe contained many industries connected to the limestone industry on Gotland. The limestone industry closed down in 1990. The old lime kiln can still be seen as a part of Bläse lime industry museum along with the old railway. One of the old limestone quarries at Ar in north Fleringe is now filled with water so clear and blue it has been named the Blue Lagoon. It is a popular destination for people on the island.

Lakes and research 
The Lake Bästeträsk is the largest lake on Gotland.

The long, flat stone beaches at Ar in north Fleringe makes this an ideal location for weather and fishing research. There are two research stations at Ar, Fårösund väderstation and Fiskforskningsstationen connected to Campus Gotland and Uppsala University. Sometimes these stations also hosts ornithological research.

Gallery

References

Further reading

External links 

Objects from Fleringe at the Digital Museum by Nordic Museum

Populated places in Gotland County
Science and technology in Sweden
Research stations
Cultural heritage of Sweden
Limestone
Mining in Sweden